Duyên Hải is a district-level town of Trà Vinh Province in the Mekong Delta region of Vietnam. The town was separated from Duyên Hải District in 2015.

References

Districts of Trà Vinh province
County-level towns in Vietnam